Mykola Zhabnyak (30 September 1979) is a Paralympian athlete from Ukraine competing mainly in category F37/38 throwing events.

Mykola competed at the 2008 Summer Paralympics in Beijing in all three throws for the F37/38 combined class, winning a silver medal in the discus.

External links
 

Paralympic athletes of Ukraine
Athletes (track and field) at the 2008 Summer Paralympics
Athletes (track and field) at the 2012 Summer Paralympics
Athletes (track and field) at the 2020 Summer Paralympics
Paralympic silver medalists for Ukraine
Living people
1979 births
Medalists at the 2008 Summer Paralympics
Medalists at the 2020 Summer Paralympics
Paralympic medalists in athletics (track and field)
Ukrainian male discus throwers
Ukrainian male shot putters